Belgian Brazilian is a Brazilian person of full, partial, or predominantly Belgian ancestry, or a Belgian-born person immigrant in Brazil.

History

Belgians have been in Brazil since colonial times. Some of the early settlers and bandeirantes from São Paulo were Belgians or had Belgian forefathers (most of them were flemings), like Cornélio de Arzam, Pedro Taques (his father was a merchant from Brabant), Fernão Dias Pais Leme (the Leme family established itself in Portugal in the late 15th century through a merchant named Martim Leme; his descendants came to São Vicente in the beginning of the colonization of Brazil), and probably Jacques Félix (it is likely that his father was also named Jacques Félix, nicknamed "the Flemish", who was from Flanders and established himself in Santos in the early 16th century). All these settlers and their relatives had huge descent, spreading throughout the southern and central parts of Brazil. Today it is still common to find these surnames (Leme, Taques etc.) in the interior of São Paulo state and neighboring states, through people who are descendants of those settlers.

With the independence of the country in 1822, Belgians kept coming through immigration. Many colonies were founded during the 19th century, especially in Southern Brazil, but also in São Paulo, Minas Gerais, Espirito Santo and Rio de Janeiro.

Belgian Colonies
Botucatu (São Paulo - 1960);
Taubaté (São Paulo – 1889);
Porto Feliz (São Paulo - 1888)
Ilhota (Santa Catarina - 1845);

Notable Belgian Brazilians
Matheus Nachtergaele, actor
Eric Leme Walther Maleson, Bobsleigh athlete, 2002 Olympian
Fernanda Paes Leme, actress
Gregório Duvivier, actor, comedian and poet
Antônio Rodrigues Arzão, bandeirante from São Paulo who found gold in what is today Minas Gerais, in 1693.
João Havelange former president of FIFA
José Maria Eymael politician
 Igor de Camargo
Daniel Henrique Hostin bishop of Lages

See also

 Immigration to Brazil
 White Brazilians
 Belgian Americans
 Flemish people

References

 
European Brazilian
Brazil